In statistics, the double exponential distribution may refer to
 Laplace distribution, or bilateral exponential distribution, consisting of two exponential distributions glued together on each side of a threshold
 Gumbel distribution, the cumulative distribution function of which is an iterated exponential function (the exponential of an exponential function).

Continuous distributions